The Barua (Boṛua; Arakanese: မရမာကြီး), are an ethnic group native to Chittagong Division in Bangladesh, Rakhine State in Myanmar, where they are known as the Maramagyi or Maramagri, and parts of Assam, West Bengal and Tripura in northeast India. According to Arakanese chronology, the Barua Buddhists have lived there for five thousand years. Another derivation of 'Barua' is 'Baru' and 'Arya' meaning great arya. They are commonly identified by their last name, "Barua". Barua is derived from "Baru" meaning "great" and "ua", meaning "noble rulers". In Myanmar, the Barua is classified as one of the seven groups that make up the Rakhine nation. Originally, the Barua title is of Assamese origin.

Chittagong was formerly known as "Chaityagrama" or "town with Buddhist shrines". The region attracted Chinese Buddhist visitors in the 7th century. In 1929, in Jhewari village a hoard of 61 Buddhist images from 9th and 10th century was found. It was a centre of Buddhism in the 10th century. Taranatha mentions a monastery named Pinda-Vihara at Chittagong where the custom of wearing pointed caps originated. The scholar Vanaratna (1384–1468 CE) who is considered the last Indian Buddhist Pandit in Tibet, was born in the Chittagong district. He studied in Sri Lanka, parts of the old heartland of Buddhism in present-day Bihar including Bodh Gaya, Tibet and then he settled down in the Kathmandu Valley in Nepal. He wrote in Sanskrit and Apabhramsha. Chittagong region is one of the two regions of the Indian subcontinent where Indian Buddhism has survived without interruption. They insist that they came from the Āryāvarta or the country of the Āryans which is practically identical to the country later known as Majjhimadesa or Madhyadesa in the Pali texts.

A Magh king, Jaychand, ruled the Chittagong region in the 16th century.

Theravada Buddhism

The Baruas used to follow Mahayana Buddhism and followed some of the Hindu customs until the mid 19th century when  Saṅgharaj Sāramedha Mahāthera (1801–82) of Arakan, returning from Bodh Gaya, was invited to Chittagong in 1856.

In the mid 19th century, the Baruas came into contact with other Theravada Buddhists from Burma and Ceylon, and these Baruas were the first groups like the Chakmas who converted into Buddhists during Buddha's time.

The first Pāli school in modern times was started in Pahartali, Chittagong by Ācarya Punnācāra with the financial backing from a zamindar, Haragobinda Mutsuddi, in 1885. Bauddha Dharmankur Sabha Buddhist religious organization founded by Venerable Kripasaran Mahasthavir in Calcutta on 5 October 1892. Kripasharan Mahasthavir was its first president, and Surendralal Mutsuddi was its secretary. The journal of the Dharmankur Sabha, Jagajjyoti, edited by Gunalangkar Sthavir and Shraman Punnananda Swami, was first published in 1908. It was subsequently edited by Dr. Benimadhab Barua.

Noted scholar Dr. Benimadhab Barua (1888-1948) was born in 1888 in the village of Mahamuni under Raozan Thana, Chittagong. He was the son of Kaviraj Rajchandra Talukder. Benimadhab assumed the title of ‘Barua. In 1913, he obtained an MA degree in Pali from University of Calcutta. He also studied law at Calcutta City College and Calcutta Law College.

He became one of the pioneers of the revitalization of Buddhism in the Barua Community. Benimadhab joined the Mahāmuni Anglo-Pāli Institution as headmaster in 1912. From 1913 to 1914 he worked as a lecturer in the Pāli department of the University of Calcutta. He went to England on a government scholarship in 1914. He earned an MA in Greek and Modern European Philosophy from the University of London. In 1917 he was awarded a D.Litt. by the University of London. He was the first Asian to do so. After returning to India in 1918, Benimadhab rejoined Calcutta University and was promoted to professorship. He improvised the syllabus of the MA course in Pali, in addition his work in the departments of Ancient Indian History and Culture, (1919–48) and Sanskrit (1927–48), in the same university.[1] 

Anagarika Dharmapala visited Chittagong in 1917, where he influenced a 9-year-old boy, who later became the well known Pali scholar Prof. Dwijendra Lal Barua.

Today, the Baruas of Bangladesh are considered a model minority, with a majority of the group being highly educated. Baruas have advanced to high ranks in government, academic institutions, science, and technology. Many Baruas have emigrated to developed countries as part of the overall Bangladeshi diaspora, commonly to countries including the United States, United Kingdom, Canada, and Australia.

Notable Barua

Benimadhab Barua
Dipa Ma
Kripasaran
Sukumar Barua
Partha Barua
Bipradash Barua
Subrata Barua
Sukomal Barua
Dibyendu Barua
Bikiran Prasad Barua
Shakuntala Barua
Dilip Barua
Julia Barua

See also
 Anagarika Munindra
 Barua Buddhist Institutes in India and Bangladesh
 Bengali Buddhists
 Dalit Buddhist movement § Re-emergence of Buddhism in India
 Dipa Ma
 Shalban Vihara

References

External links
 Article: A Brief History of Barua Community in Bangladesh

Buddhism in Bangladesh
 
Buddhist communities of Bangladesh
Social groups of Bangladesh